The Church of St John is a Church of England parish church at Shobdon in the English county of Herefordshire.  Of 14th century origins, the church was completely rebuilt between 1749 and 1752 for John Bateman, 2nd Viscount Bateman, in a Rococo style under the supervision of Bateman's uncle, The Honourable Richard Bateman, a close friend of Horace Walpole, and a member of his Committee of Taste. Simon Jenkins, in his book England's Thousand Best Churches, considers the interior "a complete masterpiece (of) English Rococo," while Brooks and Pevsner describe it as "the finest 18th century church in Herefordshire." It is a Grade I listed building.

History
The original church was probably constructed in the 14th century. Arches from the interior of this building were removed in the 18th century to form an eye-catcher in the grounds of Shobdon Court, the Bateman family home.  The Shobdon Arches, as they are known, have subsequently "weathered disastrously." Between 1749 and 1752, John Bateman undertook a complete rebuilding in the Gothic Revival style.  The architect is unknown.  Bateman's uncle was a friend of Horace Walpole and many members of their circle have been suggested as possible designers, including William Kent, Daniel Garrett, Stephen Wright, John Vardy, Richard Bentley, William Robinson and Henry Flitcroft. Jenkins himself favours Richard Bentley. The style is clearly influenced by the contemporary Strawberry Hill House and the works of Batty Langley.

The church remains an active parish church, part of the Arrowvale Group of churches.  The Parochial Church Council is supported by The Shobdon Church Preservation Trust, established to ensure; "The preservation and upkeep of St John the Evangelist Parish Church, Shobdon, a Grade 1 listed building, and the education of the public in the history and architecture of the church."

Description

Exterior
The exterior is of "coursed rubble with a slate roof." and with a standard arrangement of nave, transepts and chancel. Ogee arches for windows and door cases proliferate.  The short tower contains a belfry.

Interior
The exterior does not anticipate the "icing-sugar whiteness" of the interior, with "Gothick, Rococo even Chinoiserie flourishes."

Notes

Sources
 
 

Shobdon
Diocese of Hereford
Grade I listed churches in Herefordshire
Rococo architecture in England